Aleksandr Kucherov (born 22 January 1995) is a Belarusian professional football player currently playing for Orsha.

References

External links
 
 
 Profile at Dinamo Minsk website

1995 births
Living people
People from Slutsk
Sportspeople from Minsk Region
Belarusian footballers
Association football midfielders
FC Dinamo Minsk players
FC Bereza-2010 players
FC Vitebsk players
FC Orsha players
FC Torpedo Minsk players
FC Khimik Svetlogorsk players
FC Naftan Novopolotsk players